TDHS may refer to:

Temple De Hirsch Sinai, a Reform Jewish community with temples in Seattle and Bellevue, Washington
The Dalles High School, The Dalles, Oregon
Thomas Dale High School, Chester, Virginia
Thomas Downey High School, Modesto, California
Tilbury District High School, Tilbury, Ontario, Canada
Time-domain harmonic scaling, an audio engineering technique